The Apollo was made by the Chicago Recording Scale Company, of Waukegan, Illinois, from 1906 to 1907. The only model by that manufacturer was a five-seater with a Roi-des-Belges body. Power came from a water-cooled four-cylinder engine by way of a three-speed transmission and shaft drive.

Defunct motor vehicle manufacturers of the United States
History of Illinois
Cars introduced in 1906
Companies based in Lake County, Illinois
Manufacturing companies based in Illinois